is a trans-Neptunian object and detached object, located in the scattered disc, the outermost region of the Solar System. It was first observed on 17 March 2015, by a team led by American astronomer Scott Sheppard at the Mauna Kea Observatories, in Hawaii, United States. With its perihelion of almost 51 AU, it belongs to a small and poorly understood group of very distant objects with moderate eccentricities.

Discovery and naming 

 was first observed on 17 March 2015, by a team of astronomers led by Scott Sheppard of the Carnegie Institution for Science as part of the survey for distant solar system objects beyond the Kuiper Cliff using the new wide-field cameras on the Subaru and  Cerro Tololo Inter-American Observatory (CTIO) telescopes.

Orbit and classification 

 orbits the Sun at a distance of 50.8–74.8 AU once every 497 years and 10 months (181,824 days; semi-major axis of 62.81 AU). Its orbit has an eccentricity of 0.19 and an inclination of 35° with respect to the ecliptic.

With an orbital period of 498 years, it seems to be a resonant trans-Neptunian object in a 1:3 resonance with Neptune, as several other objects, but with a lower eccentricity (0.19 instead of more than 0.60) and higher perihelia (at 50.8 AU rather than 31–41 AU).

Considered a scattered and detached object,  is particularly unusual as it has an unusually circular orbit for a scattered-disc object (SDO). Although it is thought that traditional scattered-disc objects have been ejected into their current orbits by gravitational interactions with Neptune, the low eccentricity of its orbit and the distance of its perihelion (SDOs generally have highly eccentric orbits and perihelia less than 38 AU) seems hard to reconcile with such celestial mechanics. This has led to some uncertainty as to the current theoretical understanding of the outer Solar System. The theories include close stellar passages, unseen planet/rogue planets/planetary embryos in the early Kuiper belt, and resonance interaction with an outward-migrating Neptune. The Kozai mechanism is capable of transferring orbital eccentricity to a higher inclination.

Physical characteristics 

It is therefore not a dwarf planet candidate.

References

External links 
 List Of Centaurs and Scattered-Disk Objects, Minor Planet Center
 List of Known Trans-Neptunian Objects, Johnston's Archive
 
 

Minor planet object articles (unnumbered)

20150317
Trans-Neptunian objects in a 1:3 resonance